Dylan ail Don (in Middle Welsh) is a character in the Welsh mythic Mabinogion tales, particularly in the fourth tale, "Math fab Mathonwy". The story of Dylan reflects ancient Celtic myths that were handed down orally for some generations before being written down during the early Christian period by clerics. The story as it has been preserved therefore exhibits elements and archetypes characteristic of both Celtic pagan and Christian mythologies. His name translates as "Dylan the Second Wave", referring to him as being the second born (ail don meaning "second wave") of Arianrhod.

In some interpretations of legend, Dylan represents darkness while his twin brother Lleu Llaw Gyffes represents light.  But the more common interpretation is that Dylan is a Welsh sea-god.  Dylan was killed by his uncle, and it has been said that "The clamour of the waves dashing upon the beach is the expression of their longing to avenge their son."

In Wales, Dylan is one of the most popular traditional Welsh names for boys.

Biography
In Math fab Mathonwy it is told that Dylan's great uncle Math would die if he did not keep his feet in the lap of a virgin when not at war. Math's original foot-holder, Goewin, is raped by Gilfaethwy who is punished severely when Math returns, turning Gilfaethwy and Gwydion into a series of mated pairs of animals. Math then marries Goewin to alleviate her shame, but must find a new virgin to hold his feet. Gwydion suggests his sister, Arianrhod.  Math magically tests Arianrhod to confirm that she is a virgin, at which point she gives birth to twin sons.

Dylan's baptism
One of the sons, Lleu Llaw Gyffes, is borne away by Gwydion as a "lump of flesh" and concealed in a chest until maturity, but the other, a sturdy blonde boy, was immediately forsaken by his mother yet was acknowledged by his great uncle Math and given the name Dylan.  As soon as Dylan comes in contact with his baptismal waters, he plunges into the sea and takes on characteristics of a sea creature, moving through the seawater as perfectly as any fish:
'So they had the boy baptised, and as they baptised him he plunged into the sea. And immediately when he was in the sea, he took its nature, and swam as well as the best fish that was therein.  And for that reason was he called Dylan, the son of the Wave'

Dylan's death
Dylan is accidentally killed by his uncle Gofannon in the end.
'And the blow whereby he came to his death, was struck by his uncle Gofannon. The third fatal blow was it called'.

Mythological elements
In literature on Celtic mythology, the character Dylan is sometimes taken to be the vestige of an ancient Celtic God. According to this line of thinking, representation of Dylan in Welsh literature and in folklore alludes to the attributes of his supposed divine ancient Celtic prototype. Squire (2000:158) prefers to see in Dylan the remnants of a god of darkness:
‘[T]wo sons were born at one birth – Dylan and Lleu, who are considered as representing the twin powers of darkness and light. The clamour of the waves dashing upon the beach is the expression of their longing to avenge their son. The sound of the sea rushing up the mouth of the River Conwy is still known as "Dylan's death-groan". A small promontory on the Carnarvonshire side of the Menai Strait, called Pwynt Maen Tylen, or Pwynt Maen Dulan, preserves his name.’

Dylan's rock is located north of the Church of St Beuno's Church at Clynnog Fawr on the seashore, which must be on or near the location of his grave as told in Englynion y Beddau (Stanzas of the Grave) of the Black Book of Carmarthen xxxii:
'ynydvna ton tolo.' (Where the wave makes a sullen sound)'Bet dilan llan bevno.' (The grave of Dylan in Llan Beuno.)

On the other hand, MacCulloch (1911, Ch. VI) has preferred to see Dylan simply as the remnants of a local sea-god of Gwynedd (North Wales):

‘Dylan, however, has no dark traits and is described as a blonde. The waves lament his death, and, as they dash against the shore, seek to avenge it. His grave is "where the wave makes a sullen sound," but popular belief identifies him with the waves, and their noise as they press into the Conwy is his dying groan. Not only is he Eil Ton, "son of the wave," but also Eil Mor, "son of the sea." He is thus a local sea-god, and like Manannan identified with the waves, and yet separate from them, since they mourn his death. The Mabinogi gives us the débris of myths explaining how an anthropomorphic sea-god was connected with the goddess Arianrhod and slain by a god Govannon.’

Genealogy
In the Mabinogion, Dylan's mother, Arianrhod, is the daughter of Dôn and the sister of Gwydion and Gilfaethwy. Her Uncle, Math ap Mathonwy, is the King of Gwynedd, and during the course of the story, Arianrhod gives birth to her two sons; Dylan ail Don and Lleu Llaw Gyffes through magical means.

In the Welsh Triads, we are given a context for an actual Arianrhod who appears as the daughter of Beli Mawr and the sister of Caswallawn (the historical Cassivellaunus). Whether this reference is the result of the merging of a myth and history is unclear. It is possible that a later historic Arianrhod has become identified and merged with an earlier legendary/mythological Arianrhod.

Literary reference
Dylan is the subject of a eulogy entitled Marwnad Dylan Ail Don attributed to the bard Taliesin:
One God Supreme, divine, the wisest, the greatest his habitation,
when he came to the field, who charmed him in the hand of the extremely liberal.
Or sooner than he, who was on peace on the nature of a turn.
An opposing groom, poison made, a wrathful deed,
Piercing Dylan a mischievous shore, violence freely flowing
Wave of Iwerdon, and wave of Manau, and wave of the North,
And wave of Prydain, hosts comely in fours.
I will adore the Father God, the regulator of the country, without refusing.
Creator in Heaven, may he admit us into merry.

Etymology
The etymology of the name Dylan is somewhat complex. In Welsh, there is a bound item dylanw- which appears in dylanwad ‘influence,’ dylanwadol ‘influential’ and dylanwadu ‘to influence’. This element dylanw- appears itself to be a compound of the prefix dy- and the noun llanw ‘tidal flow’. The prefix dy- appears in numerous words in Welsh and is reconstructed in Proto-Celtic as *dī- with the meaning of ‘off, away’. The item llanw is reconstructed in Proto-Celtic as *φlanwo- ‘flood, filling.’ This *φlanwo- may plausibly have had a reduced form *φlanu- ‘flood.’ This etymology is echoed in the following Gaelic (Irish) words:

[tuinne] nf. in : gob na tuinne, the water edge
[tòn] nf. g. tòine; d. tòin; pl.+an, the fundament
[tonn] nm. g.v. tuinn; pl.+an and tuinn, wave, surge, billow

References

Further reading
Bromwich, Rachel (2006). Trioedd Ynys Prydein: The Triads of the Island of Britain. University Of Wales Press. .
Ellis, Peter Berresford (1994). Dictionary of Celtic Mythology. (Oxford Paperback Reference) Oxford University Press. .
Ford, Patrick K. (1977). The Mabinogi and Other Medieval Welsh Tales. University of California Press. .
Gantz, Jeffrey (translator) (1987). The Mabinogion. New York: Penguin. .
Guest, C. (translator) (1877). The Mabinogion. Chicago: Academy Press Limited.
MacCulloch, J. A.  (1911). The religion of the ancient Celts. New York: Dover Publications. .
MacKillop, James (1998). Dictionary of Celtic Mythology. Oxford University Press. .
Squire, C. (2000). The mythology of the British Islands: an introduction to Celtic myth, legend, poetry and romance. London & Ware: UCL & Wordsworth Editions Ltd.
Wood, Juliette (2002). The Celts: Life, Myth, and Art. Thorsons Publishers. .

External links
 Celtic Gods and their Associates
 Proto-Celtic — English lexicon
 Arianrhod

Welsh mythology
Welsh gods